999 is the debut album by English punk rock band 999. It contained such singles as September 1977's "I'm Alive"/"Quite Disappointing" and October 1977's "Nasty Nasty"/"No Pity". The album also contained "Emergency", which was the start of the band's more distinctive approach to their previous punk sound.

Track listing

Personnel
999
Nick Cash – guitar, vocals
Guy Days – guitar, vocals
Pablo LaBritain – drums
Jon Watson – bass, vocals

Technical
Andy Arthurs – production
Doug Bennett – engineering
Steve Nye – engineering
Alan Winstanley – engineering
Paul Henry – art direction, design
George Snow – logo
Trevor Rogers – photography

Charts

References

1978 debut albums
999 (band) albums
United Artists Records albums
Albums recorded at Olympic Sound Studios